Dmytro Hennadiyovych Khomchenovskyi (born 16 April 1990) is a Ukrainian footballer who plays as a midfielder for Zorya Luhansk.

Club career

Born in Vuhledar, Donetsk Oblast, Ukrainian SSR, Khomchenovskyi was a FC Olympic-UOR Donetsk youth graduate. After being included in the first team in 2007, he started to appear regularly for the side over the course of three full seasons.

On 1 March 2010, Khomchenovskyi joined Ukrainian Premier League side FC Kryvbas Kryvyi Rih on loan until December. He made his debut in the competition on 7 August, coming on as a second-half substitute in a 1–1 away draw against FC Obolon Kyiv.

In March 2011, Khomchenovskyi joined fellow top-tier club FC Zorya Luhansk. He was an undisputed starter for the side in the following seasons, netting a career-best five goals in 2013–14; in that season, he scored braces against SC Tavriya Simferopol and FC Arsenal Kyiv.

On 3 September 2015, Khomchenovskyi rescinded his contract and moved abroad for the first time in his career, joining Spanish Segunda División side SD Ponferradina. He made his league debut for the club on 13 September, replacing Álvaro Antón in a 0–1 away loss against AD Alcorcón.

On 22 February 2018, he signed with the Russian Premier League side FC Ural Yekaterinburg.

On 2 July 2022 he moved to Kryvbas Kryvyi Rih.

International career
After representing Ukraine at under-20 and under-21 levels, Khomchenovskyi made his full team debut on 14 August 2011, coming on as a half-time substitute for Yevhen Konoplyanka in a 2–0 friendly home win against Israel.

References

External links

1990 births
Living people
People from Vuhledar
Ukrainian footballers
Association football midfielders
FC Olimpik Donetsk players
FC Kryvbas Kryvyi Rih players
FC Zorya Luhansk players
SD Ponferradina players
Jagiellonia Białystok players
FC Ural Yekaterinburg players
Ukrainian Premier League players
Segunda División players
Ekstraklasa players
Ukraine international footballers
Ukraine under-21 international footballers
Ukraine youth international footballers
Ukrainian expatriate footballers
Expatriate footballers in Spain
Ukrainian expatriate sportspeople in Spain
Expatriate footballers in Poland
Ukrainian expatriate sportspeople in Poland
Expatriate footballers in Russia
Ukrainian expatriate sportspeople in Russia
Sportspeople from Donetsk Oblast